Furaana Dheynan is a 2011 Maldivian television mini-series developed for Television Maldives by Ahmed Saeed. The series focusing on the inevitable fate between a couple that are destined to be separated, stars Fathimath Azifa and Ibrahim Jihad in lead roles.

Cast

Main
 Fathimath Azifa as Aishath Rizna
 Ibrahim Jihad as Nahid

Recurring
 Mariyam Shahuza as Fathimath
 Ajunaz Ali as Wajeeh

Guest
 Mariyam Haleem as Aneesa; Nahid's mother (Episode 3)
 Mohamed Waheed as Adnan; Nahid's step-father (Episode 3)

Episodes

Soundtrack

References

Serial drama television series
Maldivian television shows